Toplica is a village in the municipality of Vrapčište, North Macedonia.

Demographics
As of the 2021 census, Toplica had 918 residents with the following ethnic composition:
Albanians 882
Persons for whom data are taken from administrative sources 36

According to the 2002 census, the village had a total of 1,274 inhabitants. Ethnic groups in the village include:
Albanians 1,267
Bosniaks 1
Others 6

References

External links

Villages in Vrapčište Municipality
Albanian communities in North Macedonia